NBO may refer to:

National Bank of Oman
Natural bond orbital, a model within quantum chemistry
Network of Buddhist Organisations
Network byte order
Niobium monoxide (NbO)
Non-Binding Offer
Non-binding opinion (disambiguation)
Northolt Branch Observatories
Jomo Kenyatta International Airport, Nairobi, Kenya
National Bank Open